Aglaothorax gurneyi, or Gurney's shieldback, is a species of shield-backed katydid in the family Tettigoniidae. It is found in North America.

References

Tettigoniinae
Articles created by Qbugbot
Insects described in 1968